Oscar Rolando Cantuarias Pastor (13 May 1931 – 8 November 2011) was the Roman Catholic archbishop of the Roman Catholic Archdiocese of Piura, Peru.

Cantuaris was born in Ascope. Ordained to the priesthood in 1955, he became a bishop in 1973. He retired as archbishop emeritus on 11 July 2006, and died in Piura on 8 November 2011, aged 80.

References

External links
 Catholic Hierarchy: Archbishop Oscar Rolando Cantuarias Pastor  

1931 births
2011 deaths
20th-century Roman Catholic archbishops in Peru
21st-century Roman Catholic archbishops in Peru
Roman Catholic archbishops of Piura